Three ships of the Soviet Navy have been named Petropavlovsk after the 1854 Siege of Petropavlovsk.

  -  formerly named Lützow
  -  formerly named Kaganovich
  -  commissioned in 1973 and scrapped in 1996

See also
 

Soviet Navy ship names